When a work's copyright expires, it enters the public domain. The following is a list of works that entered the public domain in 2019. Since laws vary globally, the copyright status of some works are not uniform.

Entering the public domain in countries with life + 70 years
With the exception of Spain (which has a copyright term of Life + 80 years for creators that died before 1987), a work enters the public domain in the European Union 70 years after the creator's death, if it was published during the creator's lifetime. For previously unpublished material, those who publish it first will have the publication rights for 25 years. Russia uses Life + 74 for authors who worked during World War II, otherwise copyright is Life + 70. The list is sorted alphabetically and includes a notable work of the creator that entered the public domain on January 1, 2019.

Entering the public domain in countries with life + 50 years
In most countries of Africa and Asia, as well as Belarus, Bolivia, Canada, New Zealand and Uruguay; a work enters the public domain 50 years after the creator's death.

{| class="wikitable sortable" border="1" style="border-spacing:0"
! Names
! Country
! Birth
! Death
! Occupation
! Notable work
|-
| Peter Arno
| 
| 
| 
| Cartoonist
|
|-
| Karl Barth
| 
| 
| 
| Theologian
| Church Dogmatics
|-
| Enid Blyton
| 
| 
| 
| Writer
| The Famous Five, The Secret Seven|-
| Hugo Butler
| 
| 
| 
| Screenwriter
| Lassie Come Home|-
| Mario Castelnuovo-Tedesco
| 
| 
| 
| Composer
| Les Guitares bien tempérées|-
| Juan José Castro
| 
| 
| 
| Composer
|
|-
| Randolph Churchill
| 
| 
| 
| Journalist, politician
| Lord Derby: King of Lancashire|-
| Carmelo de Arzadun
| 
| 
| 
| Painter
|
|-
| Kees van Dongen
| 
| 
| 
| Painter
| Woman with Large Hat|-
| Carl Theodor Dreyer
| 
| 
| 
| Film Director
| Michael|-
| Marcel Duchamp
| 
| 
| 
| Artist, writer
| Nude Descending a Staircase, No. 2, Fountain|-
| Margaret Duley
|  
| 
| 
| Novelist
| §Works
|-
| Edna Ferber
| 
| 
| 
| Novelist, playwright
| So Big, Show Boat|-
| Red Foley
| 
| 
| 
| Singer-songwriter
| Old Shep|-
| Lucio Fontana
| 
| 
| 
| Painter, sculptor
|-
| Ruth France
| 
| 
| 
| Librarian, poet, novelist
| The Race|-
| George Gamow
|   
| 
| 
| Physicist, Science writer
| One Two Three... Infinity and Mr. Tompkins series
|-
| Alice Guy-Blaché
| 
| 
| 
| Filmmaker, screenwriter
| La Fée aux Choux|-
| Otto Hahn
| 
| 
| 
| Chemist
| Applied Radiochemistry|-
| John Heartfield
| 
| 
| 
| Artist
| 
|-
| Fannie Hurst
| 
| 
| 
| Novelist
| Imitation of Life, Lummox|-
| W. E. Johns
| 
| 
| 
| Writer, aviator
| The Biggles series|-
| Anna Kavan
| 
| 
| 
| Writer
| Ice|-
| Helen Keller
| 
| 
| 
| Author, activist
| The Story of My Life|-
| Robert F. Kennedy
| 
| 
| 
| Politician, lawyer, author
| The Enemy Within|-
| Martin Luther King Jr.
| 
| 
| 
| Civil rights leader, minister
| Why We Can't Wait|-
| Robert Z. Leonard
| 
| 
| 
| Film Director, screenwriter
| The Great Ziegfeld|-
| Albert Lewin
| 
| 
| 
| Director, screenwriter
| The Picture of Dorian Gray|-
| Trygve Lie
| 
| 
| 
| Politician, author
| In the Cause of Peace: Seven Years With The United Nations|-
| Howard Lindsay
| 
| 
| 
| Playwright, librettist
| State of the Union|-
| Little Walter
| 
| 
| 
| Blues musician
| Juke|-
| Dorothea Mackellar
| 
| 
| 
| Poet
| My Country|-
| Archie Mayo
| 
| 
| 
| Film director, actor
| Night After Night|-
| Ramón Menéndez Pidal
| 
| 
| 
| Historian
| La España del Cid|-
| Thomas Merton
| 
| 
| 
| Monk, author
| The Seven Storey Mountain|-
| 
| 
| 
| 
| Writer, journalist
| Memorias de Juan Pedro Camargo|-
| Wes Montgomery
| 
| 
| 
| Jazz guitarist
| The Incredible Jazz Guitar of Wes Montgomery|-
| Elsie K. Morton
| 
| 
| 
| Journalist, writer
| Along the Road: a book of New Zealand life and travel|-
| Walter Nash
| 
| 
| 
| Politician
| New Zealand: a working democracy|-
| Edwin O'Connor
| 
| 
| 
| Novelist, journalist
| The Last Hurrah, The Edge of Sadness|-
| Erwin Panofsky
| 
| 
| 
| Art Historian
| Early Netherlandish Painting|-
| Mervyn Peake
| 
| 
| 
| Writer
| Gormenghast Trilogy|-
| Salvatore Quasimodo
| 
| 
| 
| Writer
| Giorno dopo giorno|-
| Herbert Read
| 
| 
| 
| Art Historian
| To Hell With Culture|-
| Conrad Richter
| 
| 
| 
| Novelist
| The Town|-
| Nelle Scanlan
| 
| 
| 
| Novelist, journalist
| The Pencarrow series
|-
| Upton Sinclair
| 
| 
| 
| Writer
| The Jungle|-
| John Steinbeck
| 
| 
| 
| Novelist 
| Of Mice and Men, The Grapes of Wrath|-
| Tian Han
| 
| 
| 
| Playwright
| Xie Yaohuan|-
| Rose Wilder Lane
| 
| 
| 
| Writer, Political Theorist
| The Discovery of Freedom|-
| Clare Winger Harris
| 
| 
| 
| Writer
| Away From the Here and Now|-
| 
| 
| 
| 
| Writer, playwright, historian, journalist, politician
| La cruz de los caminos, Alto Alegre|-
|}

Entering the public domain in Australia

In 2004 copyright in Australia changed from a "plus 50" law to a "plus 70" law, in line with the United States and the European Union. But the change was not made retroactive (unlike the 1995 change in the European Union which brought some e.g. British authors back into copyright, especially those who died from 1925 to 1944). Hence the work of an author who died before 1955 is normally in the public domain in Australia; but the copyright of authors was extended to 70 years after death for those who died in 1955 or later, and no more Australian authors will come out of copyright until 1 January 2026 (those who died in 1955).

On January 1, 2019, any unpublished work by an author who died in 1948 or before entered the public domain. Additionally, any published literary, artistic, dramatic, or musical work (other than computer programs) by a not generally known author (anonymous or pseudonymous) from 1948 or before entered the public domain.

Entering the public domain in the United States

2019 was the first year since 1998 in which the majority of media from a previous year entered the public domain after the expiration of its copyright term. 2019 is also the first year in this annual process, where 1923 works become public domain that year, then 1924 works in 2020, and so on forward.

Under the Copyright Term Extension Act, books, films, and other works published in the United States in 1923 entered the public domain in 2019. Additionally, unpublished works whose authors died in 1948 entered the public domain. Foreign works from 1923 that were never published in the United States may be in the public domain as well. This was the first time since January 1, 1998, that a new group of works entered the public domain in the United States. From now on, works governed by the Copyright Act of 1909 will enter the public domain at the end of the 95th calendar year from publication. For example, 1924 works will enter the public domain on January 1, 2020, 1925 works in 2021, and so forth.

No United States audio recordings will enter the public domain (as those fixed before February 15, 1972 were covered by state laws only), but international audio recordings published in 1923 entered the public domain in 2019. Under the Music Modernization Act, 1923 domestic audio recordings will enter the public domain in 2024.  However, all sheet music published in 1923 in the United States entered the public domain in 2019.

Some of the works that entered public domain are The Great American Novel by William Carlos Williams, Charlie Chaplin's The Pilgrim, Harold Lloyd's Safety Last!, Robert Frost's Stopping by Woods on a Snowy Evening, Kahlil Gibran's The Prophet, The Murder on the Links by Agatha Christie, Cecil B. DeMille’s The Ten Commandments, Aldous Huxley's Antic Hay, and Winston Churchill’s The World Crisis''. While Christie, Huxley, and Churchill were all non-American authors, these works were also published in the United States and their copyright was registered and renewed. Hence, copyright expired in 2019.

See also 
 List of American films of 1923
 List of countries' copyright lengths
 Public Domain Day
 Creative Commons
 Public Domain
 Over 300 public domain authors available in Wikisource (any language), with descriptions from Wikidata
 1948 in literature, 1958 in literature, 1968 in literature and 1978 in literature

References

External links

Popular Books of 1923 at Goodreads.

Public domain
Public domain